Jonathan Lapointe (born September 25, 1984) is a former professional Canadian football running back. He was drafted by the Calgary Stampeders in the sixth round of the 2008 CFL Draft. He played CIS Football for the Montreal Carabins.

Lapointe was also a member of the Montreal Alouettes.

External links
Montreal Alouettes bio

1984 births
Living people
Sportspeople from Quebec City
French Quebecers
Canadian football running backs
Montreal Carabins football players
Calgary Stampeders players
Montreal Alouettes players
Players of Canadian football from Quebec